Carduus nutans, with the common names musk thistle, nodding thistle, and nodding plumeless thistle, is a biennial plant in the daisy and sunflower family Asteraceae. It is native to regions of Eurasia.

Description
Carduus nutans is usually a biennial, requiring 2 years to complete a reproductive cycle. However, it may germinate and flower in a single year in warmer climates. Seedlings may emerge at any time from spring to late summer and develop a rosette. Plants overwinter in the rosette stage, sending up a multi-branched flowering stem in mid-spring of their second year.

Mature plants reach  in height with multi-branched stems. It has sharply spiny stems and leaves. The stem is cottony/hairy.

The leaves are dark green, coarsely bipinnately lobed, with a smooth, waxy surface and sharp yellow-brown to whitish spines at the tips of the lobes. They are more or less hairy on top, and wooly on the veins below.

Flowers
 

The plant bears showy red-purple flowers. The flower heads commonly droop to a 90° to 120° angle from the stem when mature, hence its alternate name of "nodding thistle". Each plant may produce thousands of straw-colored seeds adorned with plume-like bristles. They are 4 to 6 cm across, with purple-red bracts.

The number of flowerheads per plant is site-dependent and ranges from about 20–50 on good sites and 1–20 on poor sites. Flowering occurs from June to October, and seed dissemination occurs approximately one month after the flowers form. A single flower head may produce 1,200 seeds and a single plant up to 120,000 seeds, which are wind dispersed. The seeds may remain viable in the soil for over ten years, making it a difficult plant to control.

Distribution and habitat 
C. nutans is a native plant of Eurasia. It is an introduced species, and often a noxious weed, in other regions and on other continents. It is abundant in region of the North American Rocky Mountains.

It is found in neutral to acidic soils. It typically grows in meadows and grasslands, in heavily grazed land in areas such as pastures, and on open disturbed soil such as roadsides and building sites. It spreads rapidly in areas subjected to frequent natural disturbances such as landslides and flooding, but does not grow well in excessively wet, dry, or shady conditions.

As an invasive species 
C. nutans is an invasive species in various regions around the world, including in disturbed and agricultural settings, and in natural habitats.

Musk thistle was introduced into eastern North America in the early 19th century, and has been an invasive species there since. It is declared a noxious weed in many U.S. states, Canadian provinces, South Africa, New Zealand, and Australia.  Previous populations in Southern California were eradicated, but it remains in northern California.

References

External links

Jepson Manual Treatment: Carduus nutans
U.S. National Invasive Species Information Center: Species Profile — Musk Thistle (Carduus nutans)  — Lists general information and resources. From the United States National Agricultural Library.
Biological Control of the Musk Thistle in Kansas, Biological Control of Musk Thistle in Kansas
Carduus nutans — U.C. Photo gallery

nutans
Flora of North Africa
Flora of Western Asia
Flora of Europe
Flora of Afghanistan
Flora of Algeria
Flora of Estonia
Flora of Germany
Flora of Greece
Flora of Iran
Flora of Ireland
Flora of Italy
Flora of Kazakhstan
Flora of Mongolia
Flora of Morocco
Flora of Russia
Flora of Siberia
Flora of Spain
Flora of Switzerland
Flora of Tunisia
Flora of Ukraine
Flora of the United Kingdom
Flora of Xinjiang
Plants described in 1753
Taxa named by Carl Linnaeus